A silencer, also known as a sound suppressor, suppressor, or sound moderator, is a muzzle device that reduces the acoustic intensity of the muzzle report (sound of a gunshot) and muzzle rise when a gun (firearm or air gun) is discharged, by modulating the speed and pressure of the propellant gas from the muzzle and hence suppressing the muzzle blast.  Like other muzzle devices, a silencer can be a detachable accessory mounted to the muzzle, or an integral part of the barrel.

A typical silencer is a metallic (usually stainless steel or titanium) cylinder containing internal sound baffles, with a hollow bore to allow the projectile (bullet) to exit normally.  During firing, the bullet flies through the bore with little hindrance, but most of the expanding gas ejecta behind it is retained through a longer and convoluted escape path created by the baffles, prolonging the release time.  This slows down the gas and dissipates its kinetic energy into a larger surface area, reducing the blast intensity, thus lowering the loudness.

Silencers can also reduce the recoil during shooting, but unlike a muzzle brake or a recoil compensator, which reduce recoil by vectoring the muzzle blast sideways, silencers release almost all the gases towards the front.  However, the internal baffles significantly prolong the time of the gas release and therefore decrease the rearward thrust generated — as for the same impulse, force is inversely proportional to time.  The weight of the silencer itself and the leverage of its mounting location (at the far front end of the barrel) will also help counter muzzle rise.

Because the internal baffles will slow and cool the released gas and contain gunpowder that is still burning upon exit from the muzzle, silencers also reduce or even eliminate the muzzle flash. This is different from a flash suppressor, which reduces the amount of flash by dispersing burning gases that are already released outside the muzzle, without necessarily reducing sound or recoil.  A flash hider, or muzzle shroud, on the other hand, conceals visible flashes by screening them from the direct line of sight, rather than reducing the intensity of the flash.

History
In 1892 a Swiss inventor called Jakob Stahel patented a silencer intended for killing cattle though he claimed it could be adapted to other firearms too.

American inventor Hiram Percy Maxim, son of Maxim gun inventor Hiram Stevens Maxim, and co-founder of the American Radio Relay League, is usually credited with inventing and selling the first commercially successful silencer around 1902. He received his patent on March 30, 1909.  Maxim gave his device the popularly trademarked name "Maxim Silencer," and it was regularly advertised in sporting goods magazines.  The muffler for internal combustion engines was developed in parallel with the firearm silencer by Maxim in the early 20th century, using many of the same techniques to provide quieter-running engines, and in many English-speaking countries automobile mufflers are called silencers.

Former president of the United States Theodore Roosevelt was known to purchase and use Maxim Silencers.

Silencers were regularly used by agents of the United States Office of Strategic Services, who favored the newly designed High Standard HDM .22 LR pistol during World War II.  OSS Director William Joseph "Wild Bill" Donovan demonstrated the pistol for President Franklin D. Roosevelt at the White House.  According to OSS research chief Stanley Lovell, Donovan, an old and trusted friend of the President, was waved into the Oval Office, where Roosevelt was dictating a letter.  When Roosevelt finished, Donovan turned his back and fired ten shots into a sandbag he had brought with him, announced what he had done and handed the smoking gun to the astonished president. The British Special Operations Executive (SOE) Welrod pistol with an integral silencer was also used by the American OSS on clandestine operations in Nazi-occupied Europe.

In 2020, the United States Marine Corps began to field suppressors in its combat units, citing improved communication on a squad and platoon level because of the reduced sound. The USMC purchased 7,000 suppressors in 2020, and plan to have a total of 30,000 by the end of 2023, making them the first armed service to issue suppressors for general usage.

Terminology
Silencer is the earlier, more traditional term for such noise reduction devices. Recently, however, suppressor has gained currency in connection to American gun rights organizations.

The US National Firearms Act (NFA) of 1934 defined silencers and established regulations limiting their sale and ownership. Both the US Department of Justice and the Bureau of Alcohol, Tobacco, Firearms and Explosives (ATF) use the term silencer. Hiram Percy Maxim, the original inventor of the device, marketed them as "Maxim Silencers".

The earliest use of the technical term suppressor to refer to firearm noise reduction is in US Patent 4530417, July 23, 1985, "A suppressor for reducing the muzzle blast of firearms or the like".  In UK English, silencer is the common term for either a motor vehicle muffler or for a gun silencer.  Sound moderator has been used in UK English for silencers on high-powered rifles used for hunting or at ranges.

The Oxford, American Heritage, and other dictionaries apply the term suppressor to such contexts as electromagnetic shielding devices, genetics, and censorship, but not firearms.  These dictionaries define both silencer and suppressor as essentially equivalent and interchangeable, neither applying exclusively or primarily to sound, and both being applicable as much to complete and total quiet or to partial reduction of sound.

In 2011, the National Rifle Association of America began a campaign to increase the civilian use of silencers for hunting and sport shooting in the US, setting the goals of easing the restrictions in the Federal NFA of 1934, and in various state laws, regulating the sale and ownership of firearm silencers.  In the same year, the American Silencer Association (ASA) was founded by US manufacturers of silencers, with the same goals of moving silencers into the mainstream.  Along with state and federal legislative lobbying efforts, the NRA and ASA began public information campaigns designed to change the perception of silencers from their association with espionage, assassination, crime or military special operation use, to instead show that silencers can have health and safety benefits, primarily protecting the hearing of shooters and people in the vicinity, and to debunk the perceived myth in popular television, film and video game media that silencers are so effective that gunshot sounds can go totally unnoticed, such as by people in the next room of a building.

In 2014, the ASA changed its name to American Suppressor Association "in a continuing effort to dispel myths about suppressors".  Gun control advocates have said that changing the name from "silencer" to "suppressor" is semantic propaganda similar to the efforts to avoid terms like "assault rifle" or "assault weapon" in favor of friendlier-sounding language like "modern sporting rifle", while gun-rights advocates make essentially the opposite argument, and also that the widespread term silencer reflects technical ignorance and is poorly defined.

Gun rights advocates and gun media generally say that the word "silencer" is defined as meaning total silence, while "suppressor" is defined as only meaning reduced sound intensity.

Firearm noise anatomy

When discharged, a firearm makes sound from three sources:
Muzzle blast — shockwave generated by high-pressure gases escaping and expanding from the muzzle after the projectile exits the barrel and breaks the functional seal restraining the gas inside the bore
Sonic boom — sharp bullwhip-cracking sound associated with high-frequency shockwaves caused by an object (in this case, the bullet) flying supersonically through the air
Mechanical noise generated by the internal moving parts of the firearm action

A silencer can only affect the noise generated by the muzzle blast.

While using subsonic ammunitions can negate the sonic boom, mechanical noise can be reduced but is nearly impossible to eliminate.  For these reasons, it is difficult to completely silence any firearm, or achieve an acceptable level of noise suppression in revolvers. Revolvers have a looser gas seal between the barrel and the cylinder that emits noise from escaping gases. Some revolver designs attempt to overcome this, such as the Russian Nagant M1895 and OTs-38, and the US S&W QSPR.

Muzzle blast generated by firearm discharge is directly proportional to the amount of propellant to be combusted within the cartridge.  Therefore, the greater the case capacity (e.g. a magnum cartridge), the louder the muzzle blast, and consequently a more efficient or larger silencer system is required.  A gunshot (the combination of the sonic boom, the vacuum release, and hot gases) will almost always be louder than the sound of the action cycling of an autoloading firearm.  Alan C. Paulson, a renowned firearms specialist, claimed to have encountered an integrally suppressed .22 LR gun that had such a quiet report  , although this is somewhat uncommon. Properly evaluating the sound generated by a firearm can only be done using a decibel meter in conjunction with a frequency spectrum analyzer during live tests.

Design and construction

A silencer is typically a hollow metal tube made from steel, aluminum, or titanium and contains expansion chambers. It is usually cylindrical in shape, and attaches to the muzzle of a pistol, submachine gun, or rifle. Some can-type silencers, named for their resemblance to beverage cans, are detachable, and can be attached to a different firearm. In contrast, integral silencers consist of an expansion chamber or chambers surrounding the barrel. The barrel has openings or ports that bleed off-gases into the chambers. This type of silencer is part of the firearm, and maintenance of the suppressor requires that the firearm be at least partially disassembled.

Both types of silencers reduce noise by allowing the rapidly expanding gases from the firing of the cartridge to be decelerated and cooled through a series of hollow chambers. The trapped gas exits the suppressor over a longer period of time and at a greatly reduced speed, producing less noise signature. The chambers are divided by either baffles or wipes. There are typically at least four and up to perhaps fifteen chambers in a suppressor, depending on the intended use and design details. Often, a single, larger expansion chamber is located at the muzzle end of a can-type silencer, which allows the propellant gas to expand considerably and slow down before it encounters the baffles or wipes. This larger chamber may be "reflexed" toward the rear of the barrel to minimize the overall length of the combined firearm and silencer, especially with longer weapons such as rifles.

Silencers vary greatly in size and efficiency.

Two ancillary advantages of the silencer are recoil reduction and flash suppression. Muzzle flash is reduced both by being contained in the suppressor and by the arresting of unburned powder that would ordinarily burn in the air and intensify the flash. Recoil reduction results from the slowing of propellant gases that contribute 30–50% of recoil velocity. However, some suppressors can increase the backpressure produced by the propellant gases. This can cause them to function somewhat like a muzzle booster and thus increase the felt recoil. The weight of the silencer and the location of that additional weight at the muzzle reduces recoil through the basic mass as well as muzzle flip because of the location of this mass.

Components

Baffles and spacers
Baffles are usually circular metal dividers that separate the expansion chambers. Each baffle has a hole in its center to permit the passage of the bullet through the silencer and toward the target. The hole is typically at least 1 mm larger than the bullet caliber to minimize the risk of the bullet hitting the baffle, called a baffle strike. Baffles are typically made of stainless steel, aluminum, titanium, or alloys such as Inconel, and are either machined out of solid metal or stamped out of sheet metal. A few silencers for low-powered cartridges such as the .22 Long Rifle have successfully used plastic baffles (certain models by Vaime and others).

There are several unique baffle designs. M, K, Z, monolithic core and Ω (Omega) are the most prevalent. M-type, an inverted cone, is the crudest. K forms slanted obstructions diverging from the sidewalls, creating turbulence across the boreline. Z is expensive to machine and includes pockets of dead airspace along the sidewalls which trap expanded gases and hold them thereby lengthening the time that the gases cool before exiting. Omega-type baffles form a series of spaced cones drawing gas away from the borderline and incorporate a scalloped mouth creating cross-bore turbulence, which is in turn directed to a "mouse-hole" opening between the baffle stack and sidewall.

Propellant gas heats and erodes the baffles, causing wear, which is worsened by high rates of fire. Aluminum baffles are seldom used with fully automatic weapons because service life is unacceptably short. Some modern suppressors using steel or high-temperature alloy baffles can endure extended periods of fully automatic fire without damage. The highest-quality rifle suppressors available today have a claimed service life of greater than 30,000 rounds. Baffles have not been given any specific angles, a specific size, or weight to meet any standards; they are created on a trial and error basis.

Spacers separate baffles and keep them aligned at a specified distance from one another inside the silencer. Many baffles and spacers are manufactured as a single assembly and several suppressor designs have all the baffles attached together with spacers as a one-piece helical baffle stack. Modern baffles are usually carefully shaped to divert the propellant gases effectively into the chambers. This shaping can be a slanted flat surface, canted at an angle to the bore, or a conical or otherwise curved surface. One popular technique is to have alternating angled surfaces through the stack of baffles.

Wipes and packing material
Wipes are inner dividers intended to touch the bullet as it passes through the silencer, and are typically made of rubber, plastic, or foam. Each wipe may either have a hole drilled in it before use, a pattern stamped into its surface at the point where the bullet will strike it, or it may simply be punched through by the bullet. Wipes typically last for a small number of firings (perhaps no more than five) before their performance is significantly degraded. While many suppressors used wipes in the Vietnam War era, most modern suppressors do not use them as anything that touches the projectile has significant accuracy implications. All wipes deteriorate quickly and require disassembly and spare parts replacement.

Wet silencers or wet cans use a small quantity of water, oil, grease, or gel in the expansion chambers to cool the propellant gases and reduce their volume (see Ideal gas law). The coolant lasts only a few shots before it must be replenished, but can greatly increase the effectiveness of the suppressor. Water is most effective, because of its high heat of vaporization, but it can run or evaporate out of the silencer. Grease, while messier and less effective than water, can be left in the suppressor indefinitely without losing effectiveness. Oil is the least effective and least preferable, as it runs while being as messy as grease, and leaves behind a fine mist of aerosolized oil after each shot. Water-based gels, such as wire-pulling lubricant gel, are a good compromise; they offer the efficacy of water with less mess, as they do not run or drip. However, they take longer to apply, as they must be cleared from the bore of the suppressor to ensure a clear path for the bullet (grease requires this step as well). Generally, only pistol silencers are shot wet, as rifle silencers handle such high pressure and heat that the liquid is gone within 1–3 shots. Many manufacturers will not warranty their rifle suppressors for wet fire, as some feel this may even result in a dangerous over-pressurization of the silencer.

Packing materials such as metal mesh, steel wool, or metal washers may be used to fill the chambers and further dissipate and cool the gases. These are somewhat more effective than empty chambers but less effective than wet designs. Metal mesh, if properly used, may last for hundreds or thousands of shots of spaced semi-automatic fire; however, steel wool usually degrades within ten shots, with stainless steel wool lasting longer than regular steel wool. Like wipes, packing materials are rarely found in modern silencers.

Wipes, packing materials, and purpose-designed wet cans have been generally abandoned in 21st-century suppressor design because they decrease overall accuracy and require excessive cleaning and maintenance. The instructions from several manufacturers state that their suppressors need not be cleaned at all. Furthermore, legal changes in the United States during the 1980s and 1990s made it much more difficult for end-users to legally replace internal silencer parts, and the newer designs reflect this reality.

Attachment

Apart from integral silencers that are integrated as a part of the firearm's barrel, most suppressors have a female threaded end, which attaches to male threads cut into the exterior of the barrel. These types of silencers are mostly used on handguns and rifles chambered in .22LR. More powerful rifles may use this type of attachment, but harsh recoil may cause the suppressor to over-tighten to the barrel and the suppressor can become difficult to remove. SilencerCo's Salvo silencer for shotguns attaches via internal barrel threading normally used to mount removable chokes.

Military rifles such as the M16 or M14 often use quick-detach suppressors that use coarser than normal threads and are installed over an existing muzzle device such as a flash suppressor and can include a secondary locking mechanism to allow the shooter to quickly and safely add or remove a sound suppressor based on individual needs.

Advanced types

In addition to containing and slowly releasing the gas pressure associated with muzzle blast or reducing pressure through the use of coolant mediums, advanced silencer designs attempt to modify the properties of the sound waves generated by the muzzle blast. In these designs, effects known as frequency shifting and phase cancellation (or destructive interference) are used in an attempt to make the suppressor quieter. These effects are achieved by separating the flow of gases and causing them to collide with one another or by venting them through precision-made holes. The intended effect of frequency shifting is to shift audible sound waves frequencies into ultrasound (above 20 kHz), beyond the range of human hearing. The Russian AN-94 assault rifle has a muzzle attachment that claims apparent noise reduction by venting some gases through a "dog-whistle" type channel. Phase cancellation occurs when similar sound waves encounter one another 180° out of phase, cancelling the amplitude of the wave and eliminating the pressure variations perceived as sound.

An alternate method under development is called an "anti-phase destructive interference generator." The process duplicates the sound waves generated by the muzzle blast and then uses them to create an anti-phase auditory signal. Currently, this is a muzzle attached device and is only being tested to cancel out the gunshot sound of the firearm. The devices tested incorporate multiple microphones, speakers, and an auditory processor. The first shot fired is recorded, and then played back precisely out of sync(180 degrees out of phase) with each subsequent shot. This has proven successful with small caliber(.17-.22) rifles, but the amplitude has not been matched efficiently with larger cartridges. With the use of subsonic ammunition, the resultant sound waves effectively cancel out one another, and with the exception of the sound of the action cycling, completely eliminate any gunshot sound. In the current development stage, this has worked only in close proximity to the shooter, and the pressure wave (p-wave) can still be felt. Each time a different type of ammunition or firearm is used, the device needs recalibration.

Taking advantage of either property requires that the silencer be designed within the specification of the muzzle blast in mind. For example, the velocity of the sound waves is a major factor. This figure can change significantly between different cartridges and barrel lengths.

However, these concepts are controversial because a muzzle blast creates broadband noise rather than pure tones, and phase cancellation in particular is therefore extremely difficult (if not impossible) to achieve. Some suppressor manufacturers claim to use phase cancellation in their designs.

From a physics standpoint, supersonic cartridge loads are impractical to suppress past the levels that are merely hearing-safe for the shooter due to the sonic boom emitted by the bullet, and cartridges such as .22 LR and .45 ACP have long been recognized as the easiest to suppress even if using technology dating back to the 1940s.

Captive-piston silencer
Another silencer technology uses a captive piston cartridge; examples are the Smith & Wesson Quiet Special Purpose Revolver (QSPR) and the Soviet and Russian PSS silent pistol, OTs-38 Stechkin silent revolver and the MTs-116M suppressed sniper rifle, a 12.7 mm silenced development of the 7.62mm MTs-116M. The large calibre allows the bullet to be fired at subsonic speed, eliminating a major source of noise, while retaining accuracy, range, and effectiveness. All of these weapons use special, very expensive, captive-piston ammunition; QSPR ammunition resembled metal-cased .410-bore shotgun shells. The cartridge case internally works as a piston to trap the gases; the piston pushes the bullet, but the gases are retained in the cartridge case instead of being expelled noisily; in tests of the PSS the sound pressure level was 124.6 dB, similar to a suppressed .22 rimfire pistol. The ammunition itself, rather than the weapon, is silent; in the US each individual round is considered to be a silencer, subject to regulations on silencers.

Improvised silencers
Improvised silencers have been made from a variety of materials. In 2015, Los Angeles County sheriff deputies recovered a Sa vz. 26 submachine gun with an automobile oil filter attached. PVC pipes, plastic water bottles, and foam-filled pillows are also used. In the United States, improvised silencers are governed by the same laws as manufactured ones.

Characteristics

Functionally, a suppressor is meant to diminish the report of a discharged round, or make its sound unrecognizable. Other sounds emanating from the weapon remain unchanged. Even subsonic bullets make distinct sounds by their passage through the air and striking targets, and supersonic bullets produce a small sonic boom, resulting in a ballistic crack. Semi-automatic and fully automatic firearms also make distinct noises as their actions cycle, ejecting the fired cartridge case and loading a new round.

Aside from reductions in volume, suppressors tend to alter the sound to something that is not identifiable as a gunshot. This reduces or eliminates attention drawn to the shooter. A Finnish expression dating from the Winter War says that "A silencer does not make a soldier silent, but it does make him invisible." Silencers are particularly useful in enclosed spaces where the sound, flash and pressure effects of a weapon being fired are amplified. Such effects may disorient the shooter, affecting situational awareness, concentration and accuracy, and can permanently damage hearing very quickly.

As the suppressed sound of firing is overshadowed by ballistic crack, observers can be deceived as to the location of the shooter, often from 90 to 180 degrees from his actual location. However, counter-sniper tactics can include gunfire locators, such as the U.S. Boomerang system, where sensitive microphones are coupled to computers running algorithms, and use the ballistic crack to detect and localize the origin of the shot.

There are many advantages to using a silencer that are not related to the sound.

Hunters using centerfire rifles find silencers bring various important benefits that outweigh the extra weight and resulting change in the firearm's center of gravity. The most important advantage of a suppressor is the hearing protection for the shooter as well as their companions. Many hunters have suffered permanent hearing damage due to someone else firing a high-caliber gun too closely without warning. By reducing noise, recoil and muzzle-blast, it also enables the firer to follow through calmly on their first shot and fire a further carefully aimed shot without delay if necessary. Wildlife of all kinds are often confused as to the direction of the source of a well-suppressed shot. In the field, however, the comparatively large size of a centerfire rifle suppressor can cause unwanted noise if it bumps or rubs against vegetation or rocks, so many users cover them with neoprene sleeves.

Silencers reduce firing recoil significantly, primarily by diverting and trapping the propellant gas. The gas generally has much less mass than the projectile, but it exits the muzzle at multiples of the projectile velocity, so reducing the speed and quantity of the gas expelled can significantly reduce the total momentum of the matter (gas and projectile) leaving the barrel, the negation of which, because momentum is conserved, is transferred to the gun as recoil. Paulson et al., discussing low-velocity pistol calibers, suggest the recoil reduction is around 15%. With high-velocity calibers, recoil reduction runs in the range of 20–30%. The added mass of the suppressor—normally 300 to 500  grams—also helps to manage the recoil.

A suppressor also cools the hot gases coming out of the barrel enough that most of the lead-laced vapor that leaves the barrel condenses inside the silencer, reducing the amount of lead that might be inhaled by the shooter and others around them. However, in auto-loading actions, this might be offset by increased back pressure, which results in propellant gas blowing back into a shooter's face through the chamber during case ejection.

Subsonic ammunition

In weapons firing supersonic ammunition, the bullet itself produces a loud and very sharp sound as it leaves the muzzle in excess of the speed of sound and gradually reducing speed as it travels downrange. This is a small sonic boom, and is referred to in the firearm field as ballistic crack or sonic signature. Subsonic ammunition eliminates this sound, but at the cost of lower velocity, resulting in decreased range and much decreased muzzle energy, thus lessening effectiveness on the target; this can be compensated for by increasing bullet weight. Military marksmen and police units may use subsonic ammunition in suppressed rifles when minimal noise is more important than range and energy.

However, the numeric effectiveness of subsonic rounds is, again, misrepresented by media. Independent testing of commercially available firearm suppressors with commercially available subsonic rounds has found that .308 subsonic rounds decreased the volume at the muzzle by 10 to 12 dB when compared to the same caliber of suppressed supersonic ammunition. When combined with silencers, the subsonic .308 rounds metered between 121 and 137 dB.

The ballistic crack depends on the speed of sound, which in turn depends mainly on air temperature. Bullets that travel near the speed of sound are considered transonic, which means that the airflow over the surface of the bullet, which at points travels faster than the bullet itself, can break the speed of sound. Pointed bullets, which gradually displace air, can get closer to the speed of sound than round- or snub-nosed bullets before becoming transonic.

Special cartridges have been developed for use with a silencer. These cartridges use very heavy bullets to make up for the energy lost by keeping the bullet subsonic. A good example of this is the .300 Whisper cartridge, which is formed from a necked-up .221 Remington Fireball cartridge case. While this is similar to the energy available from the .45 ACP pistol cartridge, the reduced diameter, and streamlined shape of the heavy .30 caliber bullet provides far better external ballistic performance, improving range substantially.

9×19 mm Parabellum, a very popular caliber for suppressed shooting, can use almost any factory-loaded  weight round to achieve subsonic performance.

The Soviet/Russian armor-piercing 9×39mm ammunition used in rifles such as the AS Val has a high subsonic ballistic coefficient, high retained downrange energy, high sectional density, and moderate recoil.

Without using subsonic ammunition, the muzzle velocity of a supersonic bullet can be lowered by other means, before it leaves the barrel. Some silencer designs, called integrals, do this by allowing gas to bleed off along the length of the barrel before the projectile exits. The MP5SD is an example of this, with holes right after the chamber of the barrel used to reduce a regular 115 or 124 gr ammunition to subsonic velocities.

Effectiveness

Live tests by independent reviewers of numerous commercially available suppressors find that even low-power, unsuppressed .22 LR handguns produce gunshots over 160 decibels. A recent study of various suppressors reported peak sound pressure level reductions between 17 dB and 24 dB. Another study evaluated two calibers of rifle and nine suppressors, .223 caliber AR-15 (five suppressors) and .300 caliber AAC Blackout (four suppressors), and reported noise reduction of the peak sound level pressure between 7 dB and 32 dB. The De Lisle carbine, a British World War II suppressed rifle used in small numbers by Special Forces, was recorded at 85.5 dB in official firing tests.

Comparatively, ear protection commonly used while shooting provides 18 to 32 dB of sound reduction at the ear. For additional comparison, chainsaws, rock concerts, rocket engines, pneumatic drills, small firecrackers, and ambulance sirens are rated between 100 and 140 dB.

While some consider the noise reduction of a suppressor significant enough to permit safe shooting without hearing protection ("hearing safe"), noise-induced hearing loss may occur at 85 time-weighted-average decibels or above if exposed for a prolonged period, and suppressed gunshots regularly meter above 130 dB. However, the U.S. Occupational Safety and Health Administration uses 140 dB as the safety cutoff for impulsive noise, which has led most U.S. manufacturers to advertise sub-140 dB silencers as hearing safe. Current OSHA standards would allow no more than sub-single-second exposure to impact noise over 130 dB per 24 hours. That would equate to a single .308 round fired through a very efficient suppressor. This result effectively requires all users of silencers to wear additional ear protection.

The United States Department of Veterans Affairs has stated that the most prominent disability in former servicemen is reduced and damaged hearing, and that the United States Marine Corps' decision to purchase and use suppressors would solve this problem.

Decibel testing measures only the peak sound pressure level, i.e. the overall quantity of noise at the loudest moment, and does not account for duration or frequency. Limitations of dB testing become apparent in a comparison of sound between a .308 caliber rifle and a .300 Winchester Magnum rifle. The dB meter will show that both rifles produce the same decibel level of noise. When hearing these two rifles, however, it is clear that to human perception the .300 Winchester Magnum is much louder. What a dB meter does not show is that, although both rifles produce the same peak sound pressure level (SPL), the .300 Winchester Magnum remains at that peak level for a longer time, while the .308 peaks and falls off more quickly. Decibel meters are not adequate in this and other regards to be used as the principal means of determining silencer capability. Described mathematically, dB meters take a short-time average, called the root mean square (RMS) intensity, of a sonic signal or impulse over a specified period of time (sampling rate), and do not take into account the rate of increase of the sound wave packet (first derivative of packet envelope), which would in practice provide a better sense of the human perception of sound for this purpose.

Regulation
The legal regulation of silencers varies widely around the world. In some nations, such as Finland, France, and New Zealand some or all types of suppressors are essentially unregulated and are sold through retail stores or by mail-order. In other countries, their possession or use is more restricted.

Europe

Czech Republic: C-category accessory, i.e. they are available to gun license holders and subject to registration
Denmark: the Danish Weapons And Explosives Law makes the unlicensed possession of a silencer illegal.  it is legal to own and use silencers for hunting.
Finland: a firearm silencer is classified as a firearm part by law. Purchasing a suppressor requires a firearm ownership permit, which must be shown to the vendor at the moment of purchase.
France: silencers for rimfire pistols are sold without government oversight in France.
Germany: a silencer is treated the same in the eyes of the law as the weapon it is designed for. Accordingly, suppressors for air guns, which can be purchased by anyone over 18 years of age, can be purchased by anyone over 18. A hunting license allows the purchase of a suppressor for long guns for centerfire ammunition. 
Italy: a silencer is considered a restricted firearms accessory, which can only be sold to the armed forces, police and government agencies.(Law april 18 1975 Art. 2). The exception to this is any silencers acquired before 4 November 2013, where these items can be freely retained and used. No registration is needed for these.
Norway: not regulated and can be purchased by anyone for any firearm. No licence or permit is necessary.
Poland: In 2020, a new amendment to the Arms and Ammunition Act allowed police to issue permits for firearms with sound suppressors for hunting permits. Hunters are allowed to use them only for the sanitary shooting of animals.
Portugal: Silencers "Sound Moderators" are permitted  for hunters and sport shooters since 22 September 2019   
Russian Federation: firearm silencers use (legally defined as "devices for noiseless shooting") is prohibited, and dealers are prohibited from selling them, but there is no penalty for purchasing or possession of such devices. 
Spain: firearms silencers are prohibited by the Decree regulating firearms (technically, the law just references the Decree). Airgun "moderators" are not explicitly mentioned, so they are tolerated. Ambiguous rulings by authorities are common.
Sweden: Since 1 July 2022, silencers are regulated the same way as ammunition. Anyone who has the right to possess a certain weapon for shooting may possess silencers that fit the weapon.
United Kingdom: the owner's firearm certificate (FAC) will need to show permission for the purchase of a "sound moderator". All firearms certificates have the caliber approved by the police and annotated to the document before a silencer may be purchased. While silencers are controlled components under the Firearms Act 1968, it is generally taken that good reason to possess the firearm "should normally imply “good reason” to possess a sound moderator". Silencers can be used across multiple firearms of the same calibre, or purchased for each firearm they wish to suppress.

North America

In Canada, a device to muffle or stop the sound of a firearm is a "prohibited device" under the Criminal Code. A prohibited device is not inherently illegal in Canada but it does require an uncommon and very specific prohibited device license for its possession, use, and transport. Silencers cannot be imported into the country by civilians. See Gun politics in Canada.
In the United States, taxes and strict regulations affect the manufacture and sale of silencers under the National Firearms Act. They are legal for individuals to possess and use for lawful purposes in 42 of the 50 states. However, a prospective owner must go through an application process administered by the Bureau of Alcohol, Tobacco, Firearms and Explosives (ATF), which requires a federal tax payment of $200 and a thorough criminal background check. The tax payment buys a revenue stamp, which is the legal document allowing possession of a silencer. The eight states that have explicitly banned any civilian from possessing a silencer are: California, Delaware, Hawaii, Illinois, Massachusetts, New Jersey, New York, Rhode Island, and the District of Columbia. The states of Connecticut and Vermont allow silencer ownership, but prohibit using silencers while hunting. The federal legal requirements to manufacture a silencer in the United States are enumerated in Title 26, Chapter 53 of the United States Code. Individual states and several municipalities also have their specific requirements. Federal law provides severe penalties for crimes of violence committed using firearms equipped with silencers, with a minimum prison sentence of 30 years.

Oceania 
 In Australia, use, and ownership of silencers is generally limited to government, security, and law enforcement use only and thus prohibited for civilians. 
 In New Zealand, following firearm law changes in April 2019, suppressors could still be fitted to a standard firearm.

See also
 Title II weapons
 , for a similar device but far bigger, on ends of railway tunnels
 Sound blimp, a device to reduce the noise made by a camera's shutter

Notable suppressed firearms 
 
 De Lisle carbine 
 MAC-10 
 MSP Groza silent pistol 
 OTs-38 Stechkin silent revolver 
 PBS-1 Suppressor 
 STEN Mk IIS 
 VSS Vintorez 
 Welrod
 AAC Honey Badger

Other muzzle devices 
 Muzzle brake
 Flash suppressor
 Muzzle booster
 Muzzle shroud
 Blank-firing adapter

References

External links

Firearm muzzle devices
Noise reduction
American inventions